The Michigan Army National Guard is the Army component of the Michigan National Guard and a reserve component of the United States Army.

During the Cold War only the 156th Signal Battalion was federalized on 1 October 1962 at its home stations in response to the Cuban Missile Crisis. This marked the Michigan National Guard's last call to federal duty for service outside the state for almost 30 years.

From February 2002, the 46th Engineer Group of the Michigan Army National Guard, had been reorganized and redesignated as the Engineer Brigade, 38th Infantry Division. Prior to the reorganization, the 46th Engineer Group consisted of a Group Headquarters and two battalions; the 107th Engineer Battalion and the 507th Engineer Battalion.

Elements of the 107th Engineer Battalion and the 507th Engineer Battalion served with the 20th Engineer Brigade in Iraq from November 2004 to October 2005. These units also continued to serve in the War in Afghanistan contributing combat engineer companies capable of Route Clearance patrols. In 2009 several soldiers of the 1431st Engineer Company were severely injured while in combat in east Afghanistan near the Khost-Gardez Pass. In 2012 a soldier of the 507th Engineer Battalion died in combat and several other were injured while conducting a route clearance patrol.

Units 
Michigan Army National Guard units include:
177th Regional Training Institute - Augusta, MI
126th Press Camp Headquarters - Augusta
Recruiting & Retention Battalion - Lansing, MI
1208th Military Intelligence Platoon - Taylor, MI
51st Civil Support Team - Augusta
State Medical Detachment - Detroit, MI
Detachment 15 Operational Support Airlift - Lansing
Fort Custer Training Center - Augusta
Joint Maneuver Training Center (JMTC) - Grayling, MI
1208th Engineering Survey & Design Team - Lansing
1999th AQ Detachment
1146th Judge Advocate General Detachment - Lansing
Detachment 1, 505th Judge Advocate General - Lansing
63rd Troop Command - Belmont, MI Organized in 2006 from the re-stationed 63rd Troop Command based at Jackson, Michigan; the 63rd Brigade in Wyoming assumed control of Michigan's Combat Arms Battalions on September 1. The units that make up the "Spartan" Brigade have individual unit history dating back to the American Civil War. The 63rd Brigade designation itself dates from the 63rd Brigade of the 32nd Infantry Division (United States), first formed during World War I.
1st Battalion, 125th Infantry Regiment - Flint, MI
Company A - Detroit
Company B - Saginaw, MI
Detachment 1 – Alpena, MI
Company C - Wyoming
Company D - Big Rapids, MI
Company F, 237 BSB - Bay City
3rd Battalion, 126th Infantry Regiment - Wyoming
Company A – Detroit, MI
Company B - Wyoming, MI
Company C - Dowagiac, MI
Company D - Cadillac, MI
Company I - 237th BSB - Wyoming, MI
1st Battalion, 119th Field Artillery Regiment - Lansing
Battery A - Port Huron, MI
Battery B - Alma, MI
Battery C - Albion, MI
119th Support Company - Augusta
1st Battalion, 182nd Field Artillery Regiment - Detroit
Battery A - Detroit
Battery B - Bay City
Battery C - Lansing
182nd Support Company – Detroit
Detachment 2 – Wyoming
272nd Regional Support Group
1225th Cmd Sustainment Support Battalion - Detroit
1071st Maintenance Company - Grayling
1072nd Maintenance Company - Detroit
1073rd Maintenance Company - Greenville, MI
464th Quartermaster Company – Lapeer, MI
246th Transportation Battalion - Jackson, MI
1460th Transportation Company - Midland, MI
1461st Transportation Company - Jackson
Detachment 1 - Augusta
1462nd Transportation Company - Howell, MI
1463rd Transportation Company - Wyoming
Detachment 1 – Sturgis, MI
146th Multifunctional Medical Battalion - Ypsilanti
1171st Medical Company - Ypsilanti
 3rd General Support Aviation Battalion, 238th Aviation Regiment - Grand Ledge, MI
 Company B – Selfridge
 Detachment 1
 Company C - Grand Ledge
 Detachment 1
 Company D - Grand Ledge
 Company E - Grand Ledge
 1st Battalion, 112th Aviation Regiment
 Company B at Grand Ledge
 1st Battalion, 147th Aviation Regiment
 HHC
 Detachment 1 at Grand Ledge
 Company B at Grand Ledge
 Company C at Grand Ledge
 Company D 
 Detachment 1 at Grand Ledge
 Company E 
 Detachment 1 at Grand Ledge
 351 Aviation Support 
Company B
 Detachment 2 at Grand Ledge
46th Military Police Command - Lansing
177th Military Police Brigade – Taylor, MI
210th Military Police Battalion - Taylor
1775th Military Police Company - Pontiac, MI
1776th Military Police Company - Taylor
144th Military Police Company - Corunna, MI
46th Military Police Company - Cheboygan, MI
777th Military Police Detachment - Taylor
156th Expeditionary Signal Battalion
Company A, 156 ESB, Wyoming, Michigan
Company B, 156 ESB, Kalamazoo, Michigan
Company C, 156 ESB, Howell, Michigan
 HQ, 156 ESB, Howell, Michigan
631st Troop Command - Lansing
Company D (MICO), 837th BEB, 37th BCT - Lansing
460th Chemical Company - Augusta
126th Army Band – Wyoming
107th Engineer Battalion - Ishpeming, MI
1430th Engineer Company - Traverse City, MI
Detachment 1 - Marquette, MI
1431st Engineer Company - Calumet, MI
Detachment 1 - Baraga, MI
1432nd Engineer Company - Kingsford, MI
Detachment 1 - Iron River, MI
1437th Engineer Company - Sault Ste. Marie, MI
507th Engineer Battalion - Kalamazoo
1433rd Engineer Company (SAPPER) - Augusta
1434th Engineer Company - Ypsilanti
1436th Engineer Company - Montague, MI
1440th Engineer Detachment - Grayling
1439th Engineer Detachment - Grayling
1442nd Engineer Detachment - Grayling
745th Explosive Ordnance Disposal - Grayling

Notable former members

 Rosemarie Aquilina,  judge of the 30th circuit court in Ingham County, Michigan
 Tom Barrett, member of the Michigan Senate
 Kerry Bentivolio,  former United States Representative for Michigan's 11th congressional district, 2013 to 2015
 Jerry Cannon,  retired Major General
 Marc Cayce,  American film writer, director, and producer.
 Louis Chapin Covell,   United States army officer and businessman
 Valde Garcia,  member of the Michigan Senate from 2003 to 2010
 Alvin H. Kukuk,   member of the Michigan House of Representatives from 1993 through 1998.
 Harry Lovejoy Rogers,  Quartermaster General of the United States Army from 1918 to 1922.
 J. Sumner Rogers,  founder and longtime superintendent of the Michigan Military Academy
 Paul D. Rogers,  34th adjutant general of the Michigan National Guard.
 John B. Sosnowski,  politician from the U.S. state of Michigan
 Leonard C. Ward,  Brigadier General, Chief of the Army Division (now Director of the Army National Guard) at the National Guard Bureau.

See also
 Michigan Naval Militia
 Michigan Volunteer Defense Force

References

External links
 Globalsecurity.org, Michigan Army National Guard
 Official website

 
Army National Guard
United States Army National Guard by state
Military units and formations established in 1862
Army National Guard
1862 establishments in Michigan